Georges Cipriani (born 12 April 1950) is a former militant of the group Action directe.

Early life, work and involvement with AD

He was born in Tunis to a working-class family, and later immigrated to France. In the late 1960s, he worked as a milling machine operator in the machine tool workshop of the Renault-Billancourt factory. He was a member of the factory committee at the time of the assassination of Gauche prolétarienne militant Pierre Overney on 25 February 1972. For the next 10 years he lived in Germany, returning to France in the early 1980s and becoming a member of Action directe.

Arrest and imprisonment

Arrested with his accomplices Jean-Marc Rouillan, Joëlle Aubron and Nathalie Ménigon on 21 February 1987 on a farm in Vitry-aux-Loges (Loiret), Cipriani was sentenced to life in prison for his role in the assassinations of Engineer General René Audran and Georges Besse.

After several years of solitary confinement and partial confinement, Georges Cipriani was committed to the psychiatric hospital of Villejuif during the summer of 1993.

His request for the status of semi-liberty, which would enable him to leave prison for extended periods, was denied on 20 August 2009, before being approved on 14 April 2010.

References

1950 births
Autonomism
French anarchists
Living people
People from Tunis
People imprisoned on charges of terrorism